Emily Brichacek (born 7 July 1990) is an Australian long-distance runner. She competed in the senior women's race at the 2019 IAAF World Cross Country Championships held in Aarhus, Denmark. She finished in 35th place.

In 2014, she represented Australia at the Commonwealth Games in the women's 5000 metres event. She finished in 7th place.

She competed in the senior women's race at the 2015 IAAF World Cross Country Championships held in Guiyang, China. She finished in 61st place.

References

External links 
 
 
 

Living people
1990 births
Sportspeople from Canberra
Australian female long-distance runners
Australian female cross country runners
Athletes (track and field) at the 2014 Commonwealth Games
Commonwealth Games competitors for Australia
20th-century Australian women
21st-century Australian women